Flashpoint Beyond is an American comic book published by DC Comics. The seven-issue limited series—written by Geoff Johns, Jeremy Adams and Tim Sheridan and illustrated by Eduardo Risso, Xermánico and Mikel Janín—began its monthly publication on April 12, 2022, and concluded on October 18, 2022. It is the sequel to the limited series Flashpoint (2011) by Johns and Andy Kubert. The series was received with critical acclaim from critics, with critics praising Geoff Johns' writing, art, action, and characters. The series would later go on to set up the events of The New Golden Age.

Premise

After helping Barry Allen—the speedster superhero The Flash—restore the timeline back to its original state, Thomas Wayne—the vigilante Batman—finds himself once again in the aberrant timeline known as the Flashpoint, whose existence Batman is determined to change and replace with another version of the DC Universe (DCU), all for the sole purpose of erasing the death of his son Bruce.

Plot

Prologue
Batman enlists the help of Mime and Marionette (new characters that appeared in the "Watchmen" sequel "Doomsday Clock") to sneak into the Time Masters' headquarters to steal a snowglobe that houses the Flashpoint timeline in order to prevent his father from being erased from existence. This causes Thomas Wayne to wake up in his reality where Penguin works for him and tells him that Harvey Dent wants to talk to him. Harvey tells Thomas that his wife is obsessed with Martha Wayne, who in this reality became the Joker. It is revealed that Wonder Woman didn't kill Aquaman in the timeline, but Superman was freed and now the people are afraid of a Kryptonian invasion. Thomas, confronts this world's Barry Allen, but Barry doesn't have his powers yet. Thomas tries to recreate the experiment that gave Barry his powers. However, someone destroys the chemicals and Barry dies in the lightning. Harvey Dent was on his way to rescue Thomas, but a man with a harpoon destroys the car, killing Harvey. Thomas saves Harvey's son, Dexter Dent, and confronts the man with the harpoon. The man with the harpoon says Aquaman sent him to stop Barry Allen from becoming The Flash. In a rage, Thomas kills the unknown assassin. Back on the Prime Earth, Bruce is confronted by Corky Baxter who tells him that Rip Hunter and the Time Masters will come after him.

The Clockwork Killer
A news report states that the Battle for Britain was lost and that the world's heroes have failed  to stop the war between the Amazons and the Atlanteans. The Atlanteans have refortified Britain where nothing gets in or out as the Amazon prisoners are executed daily. Aquaman interrupts the news broadcasts demanding that the humans withdraw from the oceans and turn over all nuclear weapons to Atlantis in 12 hours or everyone will drown starting with Britain. After that interruption, the news report states that the President of the United States won't negotiate with global terrorists. Thomas Wayne narrates his story stating how he had killed Joe Chill for murdering his son Bruce and did the same thing to other criminals like him as well as Barry mentioning how his reality's Thomas and Martha Wayne were the ones killed. As Thomas is dining with Dexter Dent, Oswald Cobblepot comes him stating that the murder charges against him for the death of Joe Chill have been dropped as Oswald meets Dexter. Thomas asks Oswald to watch over Dexter while he attends to business outside of Gotham City. When Oswald asks why Dexter is with him, Thomas states that he is right now a witness to a crime. As Thomas enters the Batcave, Dexter sneaks up on Oswald wanting to know if he can teach him how to work a gun. In the Batcave, Thomas becomes Batman as he suspects that Thawne can't be responsible. He also narrates that Amanda Waller is meeting with congress to propose an idea to draft every metahuman convict into the army while being under the control of somebody called "Son of Saturn". Amanda Waller's broadcast had her mentioning that Oliver Queen was killed by Freedom Beast who claimed that Oliver murdered his lover and daughter. She also mentions another sighting of Batman where he killed Poison Ivy. Batman then takes Joe Chill's gun out of its case. There were different news broadcasts revolving around Senator Thomas Wright taking the Senate hostage with help from Human Bomb, astronomer David Knight claiming that he found signs that a threat from beyond Earth is coming, every clock in Keystone City fell behind, sightings of Super-Man, blizzards occurring on the west coast, Miraclo being approved by the FDA after no side effects were found, and nuclear weapons pointed at the Parliament where Aquaman sits. Wonder Woman is shown tied up in her own Magic Lasso to a post in water as Topo is told by an Atlantean to leave her to drown alone. Topo rambles that Wonder Woman killed his father, brother, and sister. When Topo moves in close to hear Queen Diana's response on if she remembers them, Wonder Woman bites off one of his tentacles. Before Topo and another Atlantean can retaliate, Batman arrives where he shoots them and then asks Wonder Woman for her Magic Lasso so that he can get information from Aquaman in exchange that he lets her live enough to evacuate her fellow Amazons before Britain sinks. Wonder Woman gives in to the deal. Batman uses the Magic Lasso on Aquaman to get the answers on why he sent an assassin to kill Barry Allen. Compelled by the Magic Lasso's magic while struggling against Batman, Aquaman states that he didn't send Scavenger as Oswald contacts Batman stating that somebody bombed their casino. As Aquaman prepares to use his trident to touch the orb and sink Britain, he finds that it is not near him as Wonder Woman shows up and stabs him in the back with it. After Aquaman dies admitting that he actually loved Mera more than Wonder Woman, Batman states to her that he got the answers he needed as Wonder Woman advises him to tell the world that the Amazons will be coming for them. Thomas returns home to find Oswald teaching Dexter how to wield a gun. Oswald tells Thomas that someone disabled the security cameras preventing them in finding out who was responsible. Back on Prime Earth, Flash visits Batman at the Batcave stating that Thawne is back and is masking his appearance after trying to tap into the Speed Force as it is mentioned that someone is tampering with time as Corky Baxter states that it is not too late to undo this. Batman states "Yes it is".

Gilda the Good Witch
Thomas Wayne narrates about three murders that occurred while he was in Britain as the media is dubbing it the Clockwork Killer. He also narrates about being informed time-traveling champions like the Legion of Super-Heroes, the robotic Hourman, and Booster Gold as there has not been signs of any saviors of tomorrow. Oswald Cobblepot informs him that the commissioner wants to see him about what happened to his casino. When Oswald states that Dexter has been asking him about explosives, Thomas advises Oswald to educate him about explosives. At the ruins of Wayne Casinos, Thomas is told by Commissioner Gigante that the rescue workers are still looking for survivors and that a clue hasn't been found yet. She does tell Thomas about an Arkham Asylum inmate named Psycho-Pirate who states that he came to hyper-time to escape a "Dark Crisis" while noting that Bruce Wayne is supposed to be Batman. Thomas becomes Batman and goes to Arkham Asylum to confront Psycho-Pirate only to find him hanged in his cell. After seeing the writing on the wall, Batman walks down the hall when he gets the attention of Gilda Dent asking why he took her son and notes that Batman is Thomas Wayne. Batman tries to get answers from her on who took out Psycho-Pirate. She states that she didn't see the culprit and claims that Thomas drove Martha mad the day when Bruce was killed. When Gilda starts to ramble that Thomas was a bad father, Batman punches the glass window of her cell which caused its fragments to disfigure the left side of her face. Batman then flees from Arkham Asylum and then stops muggers from mugging a woman. Before Batman can shoot the remaining one, Super-Man interferes. Back on Prime Earth, Corky Baxter looks at the snowglobe noting that a storm is coming. He notes that Batman stole the snowglobe from Rip Hunter and that the Time Masters took it from someone else first. Corky tells Batman that if the Time Masters don't get here first, the original owner of the snowglobe will.

The Secret of the Super-Man
30 years ago on the planet Krypton, a rocket carrying a baby Kal-El is shot into space in a space capsule among other space capsules. The city of Metropolis was decimated by a meteor shower that followed the rocket ship and how the humanoid was freed from it by Batman. This was recapped in an anniversary news report as Oswald Cobblepot is teaching Dexter Dent how to work with explosives when they get a glimpse of a Flash-like character who needs Thomas Wayne because someone from hypertime is coming. As the mugger comes to and tries to shoot Super-Man, he is intimidated to leave immediately. Super-Man states to Batman that he needs help as Batman is not interested causing Super-Man to knock him out. Back at Arkham Asylum, the doctors found out what happened to Gilda Dent. She starts to hear a voice stating that she'll see her son as a mysterious figure appears in her cell. Meanwhile, Batman wakes up in the presence of Poison Ivy who is working for Super-Man after her apparent death. She reveals that they are in the Oasis, the only safe place on Earth which was established by Super-Man to serve as a place of refuge for people like him as it was also built by Jason Woodrue who is the Flashpoint timeline's version of Swamp Thing. Swamp Thing is working on expanding his green to accommodate the European refugees while atoning for his sins. When brought to Superman, Batman is shown a message from Jor-El stating that Krypton is dying and that the Kryptonians need a new home before Krypton self-destructs. Jor-El wants his son to disarm the people of Earth by the time they arrive and conquer Earth. Swamp Thing states that the have five days until the Kryptonians arrive. Poison Ivy states that they have to warn all of Earth while Super-Man states that his father doesn't know that there are good people on Earth. Batman already has his own mission from the mission to bring the heroes like Cyborg, Element Woman, Starman, and others. Meanwhile, in Gotham City, Commissioner Gigante is with one of her men doing an investigation where Iris West had stated that someone with clock parts on him showed up and they can't identify him. It is then shown that Eobard Thawne is dead on the bed with the word Tick written on it in blood. In Hypertime, two operatives find that a paradox has been reset and suspect that Thawne was responsible. It is claimed that Hypertime has enough problems when Thomas Wayne was around.

The Other Side of the Wall
At Arkham Asylum, Gilda Dent has broken free from her restraints. A janitor listens to a news report on how the 100 metahumans composing the controversial Task Force X have entered Europe to combat Wonder Woman. Batman finds out about Eobard Thawne being found dead while narrating that he doesn't have much time before the world plunges into chaos and he loses his chance to save Bruce forever. He starts to do an autopsy on Thawne's corpse. Meanwhile, a news report mentions a bomb causing a delay in Tobias Whale's trial. As Oswald Cobblepot goes through the refrigerator, Dexter Dent finds his way into the Batcave and pulls out a costume from his backpack that he changes into. Thomas arrives home with the clock gears he pulled out of Thawne's corpse as Oswald tells him that Dexter is gone and suspects that he's gone to visit his mother in Arkham Asylum. Thomas states that he's one step closer to finding the killer with the clock gears holding the clue to them as he starts to put the clock together. At Arkham Asylum, the janitor hears the news about David Knight's message about what's coming to Earth as Dexter knocks him out and steals his card key. He makes his way towards Gilda's cell. After putting together the clock, Thomas figures out its final piece and why the grandfather clock hasn't been working. Back at Arkham Asylum, Dexter meets Gilda's friend in Joker as she enters from a secret passage. Back on Prime Earth, the snowglobe starts to crack as Corky Baxter states to Batman that the Blueshift Power is the result of what happens when the Omniverse comes in contact with Hypertime. Corky states to Batman that he doesn't know the truth about his mom.

The Joke's on Me
Two days after the Dark Crisis, a celebration occurs detailing the return of the Justice League after they were thought dead at the hands of the Great Darkness. Mister Terrific is interviewed about the Great Darkness as the different crisis events that have occurred that involved Anti-Monitor, Alexander Luthor Jr., Superboy-Prime, Darkseid, and The Batman Who Laughs. Batman finds Ra's al Ghul in Wayne Manor wanting to celebrate both their returns. He gives Batman the ashes of the alternate Thomas Wayne who was incinerated by Darkseid's Omega Beams and research from Rorschach's journal claiming that there's still time to save his father and he doesn't have much time to do it. One day after the Flashpoint was recreated, Thomas Wayne has become Batman and narrates how the Clockwork Killer has planned to kill anyone who can change the past as Cobblepot stated that Dexter's sister didn't kill herself after the information he found. As Batman drives into Arkham Asylum, Joker starts to talk about clocks as Gilda starts to develop a second personality. Batman shows up to fight Joker while asking why she killed Barry Allen and Eobard Thawne. As Gilda takes Dexter into the elevator, Batman and Joker's fight is crashed by the Arkham security guards as Joker mentions that Psycho Pirate told her everything before she killed him. As Batman follows Joker into the secret passage, Joker claims that the Joker that fought Bruce Wayne's version of Batman was a failing comedian who had the real name of Jack Oswald White. Joker then comes up from behind Batman and stabs him. Then he follows her into her lair where she obtained a Time Sphere with plans to save Bruce's life and make sure they are the ones who die. Back on Earth-Prime, Rip Hunter shows up to confront Corky Baxter and Batman. When Rip asks Bruce if he knows why he's here, Batman states that he won't let him interfere. Corky states that he can't stop Rip as he is now "up a creek without a paddle".

The Th13teen Club
Rip Hunter states to Batman that manipulating hypertime is beyond his consistency. As Batman advises Rip to leave, Rip states that imprisoning the Flashpoint timeline in a snowglobe is like keeping a tornado in a jar. It is only a matter of time before the snowglobe shatters. Inside the Flashpoint, Batman narrates how Joker survived her fall and was behind the murders. Joker states that she gutted the ones who helped her build the Time Sphere. She swore an oath to find a way to go back in time and save their son from getting killed and also fix this broke universe. Batman shares a kiss with her and then turns her down. Gilda shows up with Dexter in order to get Joker to put her plan into action so that Harvey becomes Two-Face. Back on Prime Earth, Batman and Rip Hunter fight each other as Batman states that he won't let him kill his father. Rip states that he won't risk letting Batman tie the timelines into knots. Back in the Flashpoint, Joker talks about loss, anger, and pain have emerged in their reality. Lionheart and his Atomic Knights have been authorized to purge Britain of the remaining Atlanteans. The Son of Saturn has been joined by Sebastian Faust and his Sentinels of Magic in their fight against the Amazons. Rumors of metahumans gathering at Superman's Oasis for the upcoming invasion. Jor-El and his Kryptonian fleet are closing in on Earth. Joker then states to Batman that this tragic world has shown how broken everything is as Joker asks Batman to enter the Time Sphere with her. When Dexter asks Batman what will become of him if he does that. Back on Prime Earth, Corky Baxter sends his pet raccoon Crockett onto Batman as Rip states that he needs to release the Flashpoint timeline before it detonates and intertwines with Prime Earth as he quotes to Batman that this is for the best. Back in the Flashpoint, Dexter asks Batman if he will die. Batman states to Dexter that he won't die as he never has lived. As Joker gets in to the Time Sphere, Batman lunges towards Gilda as the Time Sphere explodes. Joker shoots Gilda to keep her from killing Batman. Then Batman, Joker, and Dexter evacuate Arkham Asylum as it collapses. Then they see snow fall. Back on Prime Earth, the power has gone out as Rip notes that the snowglobe has stabilized and that Batman gambled the fact that the Flashpoint version of his father would prove that the Flashpoint would be better without Bruce. Batman explains that the odds were in his favor thanks to the letter that his father had wrote him. In the Flashpoint, Oswald Cobblepot tells Thomas that they finally turned on the signal light which might have something to do with the spaceships over the harbor. Dexter has taken up the Robin mantle while Joker is in a special cell in the Batcave.  Batman and Robin then head out to fight the invading Kryptonians with Joker offering to hook them up with anyone who has Kryptonite. As the Time Masters work on making Bruce pay for his transaction towards them, Corky states to his sister Bonnie that Bruce will have his hands full with his mother's family soon. When Bonnie asks about the Thirteen, Rip states that the capsules have failed and that the Thirteen have been pulled back into history which is rebuilding around them. The Thirteen are revealed to be the Thaddeus Brown version of Mister Miracle, the original Aquaman who predates Arthur Curry, the as-yet-unidentified Legionnaire of the Golden Age, Betsy Ross, Molly Pitcher, Ladybug, Quiz Kid, Salem the Witch Girl, Cherry Bomb, Harlequin's Son, Steel's great-uncle John Henry Jr., Jay Garrick's daughter Judy Garrick, and the original Red Lantern. Rip states that they should pray that they will reintegrate back into the 1940s without incident. When Bonnie asks about the Justice Society of America, Rip states that they will have to handle Per Degaton. In the Watchmen reality, a 16-year-old girl named Cleopatra Pak meets Bubastis II as they work to enter a building. After one method fails, Cleopatra, now under the alias of "Nostalgia", states that they'll have to find the Watchman another way (referring to Clark Driberg from the end of "Doomsday Clock").

Publication
The Flashpoint Beyond comic book limited series was written by Geoff Johns, Jeremy Adams and Tim Sheridan, while the illustrations were provided by Eduardo Risso (who drew only the zero issue of the comic book), Xermánico and Mikel Janín. It was also lettered by Rob Leigh and colored by Trish Mulvihill, Romulo Fajardo Jr. and Jordie Bellaire. Flashpoint Beyond was officially announced by DC Comics in January 2022 as the sequel to the limited series Flashpoint (2011)—which was originally written by Johns and drawn by Andy Kubert. Comprising seven issues released by DC at monthly intervals, Flashpoint Beyond began publishing on April 12, 2022, and is scheduled to end on October 18, 2022.

Issues

Collected Editions 

 Flashpoint Beyond (Collects Flashpoint Beyond #0-6, 280 pages, softcover, December 13, 2022)

Reception
According to Comic Book Roundup, Flashpoint Beyond received an average score of 8.1 out of 10. Reviewing Flashpoint Beyond, Sam Stone of Comic Book Resources stated: "Flashpoint Beyond picks up and remixes where the original miniseries left off, exploring a version of the story where The Flash never swooped in to save the day. The creative team is firing on all cylinders as they explore this dark twist on the DCU from the perspective of its Batman."

Future
In April 2022, Johns said that the sixth and final issue of Flashpoint Beyond would serve as the basis for the creation of several new DC titles commenting: "There will be books and stories that spin out of [Flashpoint Beyond] into the greater DCU, some of them featuring characters that haven't been at the forefront for quite a while that I'm excited to see. But it'll do it in a very focused way on this side of history and time. But it is a storyline that is going to explore hopefully a different facet of the DCU that we haven't seen for a while."

In August 2022, it was announced that Flashpoint Beyond would lead into The New Golden Age, with a new Justice Society of America series and a Stargirl miniseries springing from it, both written by Johns.

Notes

References

Further reading

External links
 

2022 comics debuts
2022 comics endings
2022 in comics
Alien invasions in comics
American comics
Batman storylines
Batman titles
Comics about revenge
Comics about time travel
Comic book limited series
Comics by Geoff Johns
Comics publications
DC Comics limited series
DC Comics storylines
DC Comics titles
Dystopian comics
Mystery comics
Post-apocalyptic comics
Sequel comics
Superhero comics